Kim Seong-su (김성수, 金性洙; October 11, 1891 – February 18, 1955) was a Korean educator, independence activist, journalist, entrepreneur, politician and calligrapher, and the second vice president of South Korea from 1951–1952. He founded Korea University and Dong-A Ilbo.

Early life and education 
Kim was born in Gochang county, North Jeolla province. He studied at Waseda University in 1914 and in 1921 was the first Korean national to graduate from Kyoto University, where he majored in economics.

Career 

Following his tenure as principal of a Seoul secondary school for boys, Kim and his brothers established Seoul Spinning and Weaving Company in 1919. This was followed by the establishment of Dong-A Ilbo and other Korean language publications in the early 1920s. Kim became president of Bosung College in the 1930s and in 1947, he was part of the establishment of the Korean (Hanguk) Democratic Party, which subsequently merged to form the Democratic Party in 1949. In 1951, Kim was elected vice president, replacing Yi Si-yeong, but resigned the role in 1952. Following his resignation, he returned to the business world where he had worked prior to Korean independence.

Death 

Kim died in 1955.

References

External Links

Further reading
 Choong Soon Kim, Sŏng-su Kim, A Korean nationalist entrepreneur: a life history of Kim Sŏngsu, 1891-1955 (SUNY Press, 1998)

1891 births
1955 deaths
People from Gochang County
Waseda University alumni
South Korean civil rights activists
Korean collaborators with Imperial Japan
Korean revolutionaries
Korean independence activists
South Korean anti-communists
South Korean Methodists
Vice presidents of South Korea
South Korean journalists
Korean educators
20th-century journalists
Organization founders
Newspaper founders